The National League was the second tier of British speedway racing in 1989.

Summary
The champions that year were Poole Pirates.

Final table

National League Knockout Cup
The 1989 National League Knockout Cup was the 22nd edition of the Knockout Cup for tier two teams. Berwick Bandits were the winners of the competition.

First round

Second round

Quarter-finals

Semi-finals

Final
First leg

Second leg

Berwick were declared Knockout Cup Champions, winning on aggregate 109–83.

Leading averages

Riders & final averages
Arena Essex

Martin Goodwin 8.47
Rob Tilbury 8.11
Malcolm Simmons 7.68
Wayne Garratt 5.83
Simon Wolstenholme 5.09
Troy Pratt 4.53
Ian Humphreys 3.56
Nick Floyd 2.89

Berwick

David Blackburn 9.78
Mark Courtney 9.52
Sean Courtney 7.54
David Walsh 7.33
Andy Campbell 7.11
Rob Grant Sr. 6.97
Scott Robson 5.61
Kevin Little 1.93

Eastbourne

Gordon Kennett 9.60 
Dean Barker 9.02 
Andy Buck 8.21
David Norris 7.04
Keith Pritchard 5.83
Darren Standing 4.67
Jon Surman 4.34
Steve Masters 3.13
Darren Grayling 2.57

Edinburgh

Les Collins 9.04 
Brett Saunders 8.24
Michael Coles 6.73
Mick Powell 6.40
Scott Lamb 6.16
Lars Munkedal 5.83
Peter McNamara 4.20
Mark Pearce 2.29

Exeter

Steve Regeling 9.74
Frank Andersen 7.79 
Richard Green 7.63 
Steve Bishop 7.04 
Peter Jeffery 6.72
Colin Cook 6.66 
Andy Sell 5.72
Alan Rivett 5.30
Wayne Ross 3.27
Mark Simmonds 2.67

Glasgow

Kenny McKinna 9.71
Steve Lawson 8.81 
Shane Bowes 6.32
Charlie McKinna 5.90
Phil Jeffrey 5.42
Martin McKinna 5.09
Geoff Powell 4.00

Hackney

Steve Schofield 10.50
Andy Galvin 9.95
Paul Whittaker 7.16
Gary Tagg 5.37
Barry Thomas 4.34
Gary Rolls 4.14
Michael Warren 3.48
Lee Pavitt 3.13
Warren Mowat 2.37

Ipswich

Mark Loram 9.65
Chris Louis 9.65
Dean Standing 8.20
Alan Mogridge 7.53
Robbie Fuller 4.92
Pete Chapman 4.90
Kevin Teager 4.42
Craig Hyde 2.32

Long Eaton

Richard Hellsen 8.80
Keith White 6.76
Paul Fry 5.95
Dave Perks 5.95
Gary O'Hare 5.91
Nigel Leaver 5.52
Peter Lloyd 4.70
Mark Blackbird 3.08
Jon Roberts 2.86
Thierry Hilaire 1.37

Middlesbrough

Darren Sumner 8.00
Jamie Luckhurst 7.61
Martin Dixon 7.55
Paul Bentley 5.67
Steve Wilcock 5.23
Nigel Sparshott 4.47
Peter McNamara 4.29
Andy Sumner 3.48
Max Schofield 3.45
Dave Edwards 3.22

Mildenhall

Preben Eriksen 8.88 
Peter Glanz 7.98
Malcolm Holloway 6.56
Jamie Habbin 6.31
Dave Jackson 6.30
Spencer Timmo 4.71
Derrol Keats 4.14
Jonathan Cooper 3.07
Wayne Bridgeford 3.06

Milton Keynes

Andy Hines 6.75
Trevor Banks 6.35
David Clarke 5.96
Tony Primmer 5.93
Nigel De'ath 5.88
Mark Lyndon 5.46
Paul Evitts 4.82
Paul Atkins 4.56
Rob Fortune 4.47
Carl Baldwin 4.09

Newcastle

Rod Hunter 9.15 
Peter Carr 8.66
David Clarke 5.44
Mark Thorpe 5.17
Simon Green 4.55
Derek Richardson 4.37
Gordon Whitaker 3.39
Anthony Hulme 3.01
Steve Wicks 2.42

Peterborough

Mick Poole 8.81
Kevin Jolly 8.52
Craig Hodgson 7.55
Ian Barney 7.27
Scott Norman 7.14
Nigel Flatman 6.03
Justin Walker 5.38
Jonathan Cooper 3.76

Poole

Craig Boyce 9.33
Leigh Adams 9.21 
Alun Rossiter 7.92
Alastair Stevens 7.22
Gary Allan 7.12
Tony Langdon 6.77
Kevin Smart 6.00
Jon Surman 4.27
Steve Leigh 3.17

Rye House

Jens Rasmussen 9.29 
Glen Baxter 7.98
Melvyn Taylor 7.77
Kelvin Mullarkey 5.63
Kevin Brice 4.61
Jamie Fagg 4.15
Peter Schroeck 4.04
Carl Chalcraft 3.96
Trevor O'Brien 3.58

Stoke

Nigel Crabtree 9.77 
Eric Monaghan 8.75
Louis Carr 7.29
Chris Cobby 5.86
Rob Woffinden 4.83
Ian M Stead 4.71
Ian Stead 4.50

Wimbledon

Todd Wiltshire 9.94
Ray Morton 8.30
Neville Tatum 8.07
Roger Johns 7.52
Nathan Simpson 7.03
Nigel Leaver 5.89
Rodney Payne 5.24
Scott Humphries 4.68
Jim Dormer 3.62

See also
List of United Kingdom Speedway League Champions
Knockout Cup (speedway)

References

Speedway British League Division Two / National League